ONH or Onh may refer to:

Óglaigh na hÉireann (Real IRA splinter group), small republican paramilitary group
Óglaigh na hÉireann, several Irish military organizations
one-north MRT station, Singapore (MRT station abbreviation)
Optic Nerve Hypoplasia, medical eye condition